Morten Sethereng (born January 15, 1953) is a Norwegian ice hockey player. He played for the Norwegian national ice hockey team, and  participated at the Winter Olympics in 1972 and 1980.

References

1953 births
Living people
Ice hockey players at the 1972 Winter Olympics
Ice hockey players at the 1980 Winter Olympics
Norwegian ice hockey players
Olympic ice hockey players of Norway
Frisk Asker Ishockey players
Sportspeople from Trondheim